Cocculina fenestrata is a species of sea snail, deep-sea limpet, a marine gastropod mollusk in the family Cocculinidae.

Distribution
Colombia: continental slope of Caribbean Sea

Description
The maximum recorded shell length is 3.3 mm.

Habitat
Minimum recorded depth is 504 m. Maximum recorded depth is 504 m.

References

External links

Cocculinidae
Gastropods described in 2005